The 1912 Washington gubernatorial election was held on November 5, 1912. Democratic nominee Ernest Lister defeated Republican incumbent Marion E. Hay with 30.55% of the vote. Lister was voted in with the smallest percentage of the vote in a gubernatorial election in the 1900s.

Primary elections
Primary elections were held on September 10, 1912.

Democratic primary

Candidates 
W.W. Black
Ernest Lister, former member of the Tacoma City Council
Hugh C. Todd
E.C. Million
M.M. Godman
William Henry Dunphy
L.F. Chester

Results 
The winner of the primary, W. W. Black, was disqualified for being a sitting judge, and so the second-placed Ernest Lister was ultimately the Democratic nominee.

Republican primary

Candidates
Marion E. Hay, incumbent Governor
Orville Billings

Results

}

General election

Candidates
Major party candidates
Ernest Lister, Democratic
Marion E. Hay, Republican 

Other candidates
Robert T. Hodge, Progressive
Anna A. Maley, Socialist
George F. Stivers, Prohibition
Abraham Lincoln Brearcliff, Socialist Labor

Results

References

1912
Washington
Gubernatorial